Davyd Tengizovich Saldadze (born February 15, 1978) is an Uzbekistani wrestler of Georgian origin, he also wrestled for Ukraine and won the Silver medal in the Men's Greco-Roman 97kg in the 2000 Summer Olympics in Sydney for Ukraine. He was born in Kutaisi, Georgian SSR and is the brother of Georgiy Saldadze.

References

External links
 

1978 births
Living people
Sportspeople from Kutaisi
Ukrainian male sport wrestlers
Olympic silver medalists for Ukraine
Olympic wrestlers of Ukraine
Olympic wrestlers of Uzbekistan
Wrestlers at the 2000 Summer Olympics
Uzbekistani male sport wrestlers
Wrestlers at the 2004 Summer Olympics
Wrestlers at the 2008 Summer Olympics
Olympic medalists in wrestling
Asian Games medalists in wrestling
Wrestlers at the 2010 Asian Games
Ukrainian people of Georgian descent
Uzbekistani people of Georgian descent
World Wrestling Championships medalists
Medalists at the 2000 Summer Olympics
Asian Games bronze medalists for Uzbekistan
Medalists at the 2010 Asian Games
European Wrestling Championships medalists